Chytri (or Khytri) was one of the ten city-kingdoms of Cyprus in antiquity. It was located in the centre of the island, in the territory of Chytraea, west of Mesaoria. Today the modern town of Kythrea (Kyrka) has preserved the ancient name.

Ancient history
After 1200 B.C. and after the Trojan war many Greek immigrants led by Chytros, son of Alexander and grandson of the Athenian Akamas, hero of the Attican tribe of the same name, settled in Cyprus. Kythrea is situated near the ancient kingdom of Chytroi which was founded by Chytros. There has been found here a necropolis. In the time of the Assyrian king Assurbanipal, Pilagura was King of Kitrusi, one of the ten kingdoms on the island. Numerous inscriptions have been found in the Cypriot dialect, some in ordinary Greek. Chytri was noted for the worship of Apollo, Artemis and Aphrodite Paphia. In Delphic Theorodochoi inscription, one inscription mention the Chytri.
Later forms of the name are Cythraia, Cythereia, Cythroi, Chytrides; according to the late Greek work of Sakellarios (Kypriaka, 2nd ed., 202–205) Kyrka should be Cythera or Cythereia; he identifies Chytri with Palo-Kythro, a village with ruins two hours south of Kyrka. However, the historical texts mention only one town.

Diogenes Laërtius writes that there was a festival held at Chytri with theatrical plays.

Middle Ages
Chytri was at an early date an episcopal see. Lequien's list of the bishops of the see (II, 1069) is very incomplete, only eight being recorded: the first is St. Pappus, who suffered martyrdom under Licinius, Maximinus or Constantius Chlorus; the most famous is St. Demetrian, 885-912 (?).
 
The Greek, i.e. Orthodox, see of similar title was suppressed in 1222 by Cardinal Pelagius, the papal legate, while the islands was a Latin crusader kingdom.

See also
 List of ancient Greek cities

References

Cities in ancient Cyprus
Former populated places in Cyprus